Dhangadhi is a sub-metropolitan city in Sudurpashchim, Nepal

Dhangadhi may also refer to:

 Dhangadhi Airport, airport in Dhangadhi
 Dhangadhi Premier League, T20 cricket competition in Nepal
 Dhangadhimai, municipality in Siraha district, Nepal